Wheelchair rugby at the 2008 Summer Paralympics was held in the Beijing Science and Technology University Gymnasium from 12 September to 16 September.

Medalists

Classification
Wheelchair rugby players were given a classification based on their upper body function. A committee gave each athlete a 7-level score ranging from 0.5 to 3.5, with lower scores corresponding to more severe disability. During the game, the total score of all players on the court for a team cannot exceed 8 points. However, for each female player on court, their team gets an extra 0.5 points over the 8 point limit.

Teams

Eight teams took part in this sport. Each team could have up to 12 athletes, but no more than 11 of the team members could be male. Listed below are the eight teams and their method of qualifying for the Beijing Paralympics.

Tournament

Competition format 
The eight teams were divided into two even groups and participated in a single round robin tournament. The top two teams from each group went on to compete for 1st through 4th place, while the last two teams from each group competed for 5th through 8th place.

Preliminary round 

 Qualified for quarterfinals
 Eliminated
Source: Paralympic.org

Medal round 

Source: Paralympic.org

Classification 5-8 

Source: Paralympic.org

Ranking

External links 

 Official site of the 2008 Summer Paralympics
 International Wheelchair Rugby Federation

References 

 

2008
2008 Summer Paralympics events